Songs in Red and Gray is the sixth studio album by American singer-songwriter Suzanne Vega. It was released on September 25, 2001 by A&M Records.

Music and lyrics 
On Songs in Red and Gray, Vega returns to her signature acoustic folk-pop sound, shedding the experiments she had done in the 1990s with her husband, record producer Mitchell Froom. New producer Rupert Hine shows some traces of his past work with '80s new wave bands by employing electronic beats, but mostly allows Vega's voice and guitar to dominate in a manner reminiscent of her debut album and its 1987 follow-up, Solitude Standing.

Most of the songs, like "Widow's Walk" and "(I'll Never Be) Your Maggie May", deal with the dissolution of Vega's marriage with Froom. Her "calm, hushed, clear singing" belies the album's "mood of heartbroken defiance". The lyrics are "the most personally revealing songs she has written" in her career.

Track listing

Personnel 
 Suzanne Vega – vocals, acoustic guitar
 Gerry Leonard – electric and acoustic guitars, dulcimer, mandolin, zither
 Rupert Hine – keyboards, bass guitar, percussion, drum programming
 Mike Visceglia – bass guitar
 Nik Pugh –  drum programming, synth lead
 Jay Bellerose – drums
 Matt Johnson – drums
 Doug Yowell – drums, percussion
 Pamela Sue Man – backing vocals, harmony vocals
 Elizabeth Taubman – harmony vocals
 Stephen W Tayler – recording and mixing engineer

Charts

References

External links
 

2001 albums
Suzanne Vega albums
Albums produced by Rupert Hine
A&M Records albums